Herrebøe faience factory (Herrebøefabrikken) was a faience manufacture located in Idd, (now Halden), Norway.

History

Herrebøe was founded in 1759 by Peter Hofnagel (1721–1781) as a continuation of a brickwork,  pottery and cocklestove factory. It was in operation for approximately 20 years. Bad economic conditions and competition led to the end of production shortly after 1770. The production consisted principally of tea and coffee sets,  punch bowls, plates and dishes,   candlesticks and flower vases.  Examples of Herrebøe  faience are still preserved with the   main public collection at the Norwegian Museum of Decorative Arts and Design (Kunstindustrimuseet)  in Oslo. Items from Herrebøe  faience are also on display at the Borgarsyssel Museum in Sarpsborg.

References

Other sources
Opstad, Lauritz  (1992) Boken om Herrebøe fajansene (Oslo : C. Huitfeldt Forlag)  

Ceramics manufacturers of Norway
Norwegian brands